Lucao Township is a rural township in Chiayi County, Taiwan.

History
After the World War II in 1945, the Lucao Township Office was established on 18 January 1946.

Geography
It has a population total of 14,579 and an area of 54.3151 km2.

Administrative divisions
Houliao, Lutung, Lucao, Xijing, Lichou, Zhongliao, Shijia, Xiatan, Guangtan, Bitan, Songzhu, Zhushan, Houku, Sanjiao and Xiama Village.

Infrastructure
 Lutsao Refuse Incineration Plant

Tourist attractions
 Yuanshan Temple
 Temple of a City Ruling Deity
 Lucao Yuanshan Palace
 Shan Chen Ancestral Hall South Zaijiao
 11-Hole Water Door
 Home Town of Pencil Chen and Ming Chin Chen
 Houses of Soil

References

External links

 Chiayi County Lucao Township Office

Townships in Chiayi County